A phase switch is a device used to increase the discrimination and sensitivity of an interferometer, especially at radio frequencies; an extra half-wave path difference is switched in, at well defined frequency, between the two interfering signal sources. In-phase signals then become out of phase and vice versa, so that the signal output becomes modulated by the switching frequency, and can be more easily filtered from the internally generated noise. (The discrimination is highest for sources which are small compared with the interferometer-fringe spacing)

Its use in radio astronomy is generally credited to Martin Ryle, and used extensively in the 1C radio survey.

Interferometry